Samsung Galaxy  (stylized as SΛMSUNG Galaxy since 2015 (except Japan where it omits the Samsung branding), previously stylized as Samsung GALAXY; abbreviated as SG) is a series of computing and mobile computing devices that are designed, manufactured and marketed by Samsung Electronics. The product line includes the Samsung Galaxy S series of high-end smartphones, the Samsung Galaxy Tab series of tablets, the Samsung Galaxy Note series of tablets and phablets with the added functionality of a stylus, the foldable Samsung Galaxy Z series, and smartwatches including the first version of the Samsung Galaxy Gear, with later versions dropping the Galaxy branding, until the release of the Samsung Galaxy Watch in 2018.

Samsung Galaxy devices use the Android operating system produced by Google, with a custom user interface called One UI (with previous versions being known as Samsung Experience and TouchWiz). However, the Galaxy TabPro S is the first Galaxy-branded Windows 10 device that was announced in CES 2016. The Galaxy Watch is the first Galaxy-branded smartwatch since the release of later iterations of the Gear smartwatch from 2014 to 2017.

In 2020, Samsung added the Samsung Galaxy Chromebook 2-in-1 laptop running ChromeOS to the Galaxy branding lineup. The follow-on Samsung Galaxy Chromebook 2 was released in 2021.

Definitions

Categories 
Galaxy Z,
Galaxy S,
Galaxy Note (discontinued in 2021),
Galaxy A,
Galaxy M,
Galaxy J (discontinued in 2019),
Galaxy Tab,
Galaxy Fit,
Galaxy Watch,
Galaxy Grand (discontinued).

Smartphones 
The flagship Galaxy smartphones are the Galaxy S and the phablet Galaxy Note series. The Galaxy Z series are foldable smartphones. The Galaxy A series, Galaxy M series and Galaxy F series are mid-ranges. Other series such as the C, J, and W are discontinued.

Model numbers 
Since September 2013,  model numbers of devices in the Samsung Galaxy series are in the "SM-XXXX" format (excluding the Galaxy J SC-02F, Galaxy Centura SCH-S738C, and SGH-N075T). Previously, from 2009 until September 2013, the model numbers were in the "GT-XXXX" format.

 SM-Nnn0 – mainstream Note model (New type of model number)
 SM-Tnn0/1/5/6 – mainstream Tab model (New type of model number)
 SM-Pnn0/5 - mainstream Tab with S Pen Stylus model
 GT-Snnn2/ SM-Gnnn/DS  / SM-Gnnn/DD SM-Gnnn2 Dual-SIM "Duos" model
 GT-Snnn5/GT-Nnnn5/GT-Pnnn5/GT-Innn5/SM-NnnnF/SM-Tnn5/SM-GnnnF – 4G/LTE model
 SM-Wnnn – Windows model (i.e., Galaxy Book)
 SM-Gnnn - S series model
 SM-Fnnn – Z series model, F series model
 SM-Ennn – F series model
 SM-Annn – A series model
 SM-Mnnn – M series model
 SM-Snnn – S series model
 SM-Xnnn – Tab S model

Devices

Phones

Samsung Galaxy Z (Zen) series 

The Galaxy Z series is a line of high-end foldable smartphones. The line started in 2019 with the Galaxy Z Fold. The latest phones from this series are the Galaxy Z Flip4 and the Galaxy Z Fold4, both released in August 2022.

Samsung Galaxy S (Super Smart) series 

The Galaxy S series is a line of high-end smartphones. The latest models are the Galaxy S23, S23+, and S23 Ultra, released in February 2023.

Samsung Galaxy A (Alpha) series 

The Galaxy A series is a line of mid-range to high-end Android smartphones manufactured by Samsung Electronics. The Galaxy A series is similar to the high-end Galaxy S series, but with lower specifications and features.

Samsung Galaxy M (Millennial) series 

The Galaxy M series is a line of online-exclusive, mid-range; considered as the successor to the Galaxy J and Galaxy On series.

Samsung Galaxy F (Fun/Flipkart) series 

The Galaxy F series is a newer line of mid-range to low-end phones.

Galaxy XCover series 
The Galaxy XCover series is a line of rugged "business" phones, which have low-end specifications but with stronger build quality and durability.

Discontinued lines 
Samsung released multiple series of smartphones, often overlapping with each other. Most of these series were dropped.

 The Galaxy Note series was a line of high-end devices primarily oriented towards pen computing. The line was replaced by the Galaxy S Ultra series.
 The Galaxy Core/Grand series is a line of mid-range devices released between 2013 and 2015. The line was replaced by the J series.
 The Galaxy J series was a line of entry-range phones, replaced by the Galaxy A series in 2019.
 The Galaxy Mega series was last updated in 2014 with the Samsung Galaxy Mega 2.The line's successor is the Galaxy M series.
 The Galaxy On series is a line of online-exclusive phones. The series was replaced by the Galaxy M series.
 The Galaxy Mini series was last updated in 2012 with the Samsung Galaxy Mini 2.
 The Galaxy Trend series was last updated in 2013 with the Samsung Galaxy Trend Plus.
 The Galaxy Ace series was last updated in 2014 with the Samsung Galaxy Ace 4.
 The Galaxy R Series was last updated in 2012 with the Samsung Galaxy R Style
 The Galaxy Young Series is a low-end line. It was last updated in 2014 with the Samsung Galaxy Young 2.
 The Galaxy Pocket series was last updated in 2014 with the Samsung Galaxy Pocket 2.
 The Galaxy C series was a line of upper mid-range devices for specific markets. The latest device released under this line is the Samsung Galaxy C8.
 The Galaxy E series was replaced by Galaxy F Series.

Other phones

Tablets

Samsung Galaxy Tab Series 

The Samsung Galaxy Tab series is a line of Android-powered tablets. There are two sub-categories currently under this series:

 The Galaxy Tab S is a line of high-end tablets, with a focus on productivity and pen computing. The Samsung Galaxy Tab S8, S8+ & S8 Ultra are the latest devices, released in February 2022.
 The Galaxy Tab A is a line of mid-range to low-end tablets.

Wearables

Smartwatches 

Samsung announced the Samsung Galaxy Gear, a smartwatch running Android 4.3, on 4 September 2013. The Galaxy Gear was Samsung's only smartwatch to feature "Galaxy" branding; later Samsung smartwatches use the Samsung Gear branding. The Gear series was later succeeded by the Samsung Galaxy Watch series.

In a software update in May 2014, Samsung replaced the operating system of the Galaxy Gear from Android to Tizen. Samsung's One UI, which is running on newer Samsung Galaxy devices released after 2019, is available to Samsung Galaxy Watch on 20 May 2019.

Activity trackers 
Samsung announced the Samsung Galaxy Fit, an activity tracker positioned below the Galaxy Watch line. The first iteration was released on 2019. Samsung later announced the Galaxy Fit2, which is a follow up of their first tracker from 2019.

Wireless earbuds 

Samsung announced the Samsung Galaxy Buds, which is the new replacement to the Samsung Gear IconX.. The first iteration was released on 20 February 2019. Subsequent Galaxy Buds iterations will be revealed during the Galaxy Unpacked event annually.

Laptops 

In 2020, Samsung released the Samsung Galaxy Chromebook 2-in-1 laptop running ChromeOS. In 2021, the followup Samsung Galaxy Chromebook 2 was released. These laptops are based on ChromeOS rather than Android.

Other

Media player 
 Samsung Galaxy Player

Cameras 
 Samsung Galaxy Camera
 Samsung Galaxy Camera 2
 Samsung Galaxy NX

Projectors 
 Samsung Galaxy Beam i8520
 Samsung Galaxy Beam i8530

Release history

Region locking and CSC codes 
Starting from the Samsung Galaxy Note 3, Samsung phones and tablets contained a warning label stating that it would only operate with SIM cards from the region the phone was sold in. A spokesperson clarified the policy, stating that it was intended to prevent grey-market reselling, and that it only applied to the first SIM card inserted. For devices to use a SIM card from other regions, one of the following actions totaling five minutes or longer in length must first be performed with the SIM card from the local region:

 Make calls on the phone or watch from the Samsung Phone app
 Use the Call and Text on Other Devices feature to make calls

With the launch of the Samsung Galaxy S8 series in 2017, that process has changed. Due to the fact that many variants use a Multi-CSC, it will only work with SIM cards from the same CSC group. For example, an AT&T SIM card will not work on cellular-based Galaxy devices sold in Europe and other countries.

"Over the Horizon"
"Over the Horizon" is the trademark sound for Samsung smartphone devices, first introduced in 2011 on the Galaxy S II. It was composed by Joong-sam Yun and appears as music in the music library of most Samsung phones released since 2011. Prior to 2011, "Beyond Samsung" served as Samsung's trademark music track, while "Samsung Tune" was used as the default ringtone. The sound appears as the default ringtone, as well as the sound when the phone turns on or off (a snippet is used), and as a notification sound. While the basic composition of the six-note tune has not changed since its inception, various versions of different genres have been introduced as the product line evolved. 

While the first two versions were created in-house at Samsung, later versions were outsourced to external musicians. These include symphonic arrangements by Jamie Christopherson in 2013 and 2015, a jazz fusion arrangement by Swedish band Dirty Loops in 2016, a crossover by Grammy winner Jacob Collier in 2017, an orchestral arrangement by Icelandic composer Pétur Jónsson in 2018, a classical crossover by Academy Award-winning composer Steven Price in 2019 performed by the London Philharmonic Orchestra, a nature inspired version in 2020, an all-piano composition by Korean pianist Yiruma in 2021, and a jazztronica version by LA-based musician Kiefer Shackelford in 2022. The sound has been covered by various popular artists who have released their own arrangements and remixes of the song, such as Quincy Jones, Icona Pop, Yiruma, Suga of BTS, and various K-Pop artists.

In Samsung's U.S. registration of the trademark for the sound, it is described as "the sound of a bell playing a B4 dotted eighth note, a B4 sixteenth note, an F#5 sixteenth note, a B5 sixteenth note, an A#5 eighth note, and an F#5 half note".

See also 
 Comparison of Samsung Galaxy S smartphones
 Comparison of smartphones
 Samsung Galaxy Z series
 Samsung Galaxy S series
 Samsung Galaxy Note series
 Samsung Galaxy A series
 Samsung Galaxy M series
 Samsung Galaxy Tab series
 Samsung Galaxy Watch series
 Lists of mobile computers

References

External links 

 

 
Samsung smartphones
Mobile phones introduced in 2009
Computer-related introductions in 2009
Products introduced in 2009
Consumer electronics brands
Samsung Galaxy
South Korean brands